The office of the Domestic of the Schools was a senior military post of the Byzantine Empire, extant from the 8th century until at least the early 14th century. Originally simply the commander of the Scholai, the senior of the elite tagmata regiments, the Domestic quickly rose in prominence: by the mid-9th century, its holders essentially occupied the position of commander-in-chief of the Byzantine army, next to the Emperor. The office was eclipsed in the 12th century by that of the Grand Domestic, and in the Palaiologan period (13th–15th centuries), it was reduced to a purely honorary, mid-level court dignity.

History 
These were elite cavalry regiments stationed in or around the capital Constantinople, commanded by officers titled "Domestics" (δομέστικοι) and distinct from the provincial armies of the themes under their respective . The Schools was the senior tagma, tracing their origin to the Scholae Palatinae established by Constantine the Great and originally placed under the command of the magister officiorum. The historian J.B. Bury has traced a reference to a certain Anianos, "Domestic of the magister", in the Chronicon Paschale for the year 624, and considers this official to be the predecessor of the Domestic of the Schools. As the magister officiorum was gradually deprived of some of his functions in the 7th and 8th centuries, the Domestic apparently became an independent official.

In the 9th century, the office of the Domestic, or "Domesticate" (δομεστικάτον), of the Schools rose in importance and its holder was often appointed as the head of the army in the absence of the emperor. However, this role was not yet enshrined: it depended rather on the abilities of the current Domestic, and other generals of inferior rank were sometimes entrusted with supreme command instead. The Domestic of the Schools nevertheless rose to such prominence that the sources frequently speak of the office as "the Domestic" without further qualification, and the power and influence of the post saw it frequently occupied by persons closely related to the emperor. In practice, he quickly became senior even to the latter, as demonstrated by the fact that military leaders like Nikephoros Phokas and John Tzimiskes were promoted from the generalship of the Anatolics to the Domesticate.

In the reign of Romanos II the post was split, with a "Domestic of the West" and a "Domestic of the East" being created for operations in Europe and Asia respectively. The ceremony for the Domestic's appointment is described in the De Ceremoniis (II.3); the same work describes his duties and role in court ceremonies.

With some exceptions, most notably the unparalleled 22-year tenure of John Kourkouas, or in times of domestic instability, Domestics were changed on the average every three to four years. During the 10th century, the Domesticate of the Schools was dominated by members of the Phokas family, which produced six holders of the office. Their attempts to monopolize the office led a series of emperors, concerned over the power of the military aristocracy, to entrust the potentially over-powerful office to non-military court officials, including—especially in the first half of the 11th century, before the military aristocracy reasserted its authority—to eunuchs, even though this was in theory forbidden, with the alternate office of  having been created for this purpose.

In the 10th and 11th centuries, the variant "Grand Domestic" (μέγας δομέστικος) appears sporadically, used in parallel with other variants such as "Grand Domestic of the Schools" or "Grand Domestic of the East/West" for the same person. The Byzantinist Rodolphe Guilland considers most of these early references either as anachronistic references by 12th-century writers, or simply cases where "" is used as an honorific prefix, as was the norm with other senior offices during this period, like the Drungary of the Watch or the Domestic of the Excubitors. Nevertheless, Guilland argues that from the time of Alexios I Komnenos on, the "Grand Domestic" became a separate office, senior to the "plain" Domestics of the Schools and in effect the new commander-in-chief of the army beside the Emperor. However, the usage of the titles is not consistent, and the habitual division of command between East and West seems to have been sometimes applied to the Grand Domesticate as well during the 12th century, causing some confusion as to the nature of the office and its relation to the "plain" Domestic. In the 13th century however the two titles became clearly distinct: the Grand Domestic was the commander-in-chief of the entire army and one of the highest offices of state, while the Domestic of the Schools was relegated to a simple dignity without duties, awarded to provincial governors and other middle-ranking officials. In the words of the mid-14th century Book of Offices of Pseudo-Kodinos, "the Domestic of the Schools once had an office similar to that of the Grand Domestic currently, but he now holds none".

The Domestic's distinctive court dress, as reported by Pseudo-Kodinos, consisted of a gold-brocaded hat, a plain silk  tunic and a silver staff with a knob on top and another in the middle. For ceremonies and festivities, he bore the domed , of lemon-yellow silk and decorated with gold wire embroidery, and with a portrait of the emperor seated on a throne in front and another with the emperor on horseback on the rear.

List of known holders 

The list above does not include holders known only through their seals but otherwise unidentified. For seals from the 8th–10th centuries, cf. .

References

Sources 

 
 
 
 
 
 
 
 
 
 
 
 

Byzantine military offices
Byzantine court titles
 
Lists of office-holders in the Byzantine Empire